The Air Traffic Control System Command Center (ATCSCC)is a part of the Federal Aviation Administration (FAA) air traffic control system, located in Warrenton, Virginia (Vint Hill Farms Station).

External links
 Flight Delay Information - Air Traffic Control System Command Center – Federal Aviation Administration

System Command Center
Federal Aviation Administration
Buildings and structures in Fauquier County, Virginia